Carlos Berlocq is the defending champion.

Seeds

Draw

Finals

Top half

Bottom half

References
 Main Draw
 Qualifying Draw

Aberto de Tenis do Rio Grande do Sul - Singles
2015 Singles